Anti-Anti is the debut album by the band Snowden. Some tracks on this album are also on The Snowden EP.

Track listing 
 "Like Bullets"
 "Anti-Anti"
 "My Murmuring Darling"
 "Filler Is Wasted"
 "Black Eyes"
 "Between the Rent and Me"
 "Counterfeit Rules"
 "Innocent Heathen"
 "Stop Your Bleeding"
 "Kill the Power"
 "Victim Card"
 "Sisters"

Personnel 
 Jordan Jeffares - guitar, keyboards, lead vocals
 Chandler Rentz - drums, vocals
 Corinne Lee - bass, keyboards, vocals
 David Payne - guitar

Credits
 Erik Wofford - noise, producer, engineer, mixing
 Alan Douches - mastering

References

External links
 

2006 debut albums
Snowden (band) albums
Jade Tree (record label) albums